The Angelic Sisters of Saint Paul are a Roman Catholic religious order founded by Anthony Maria Zaccaria in Milan, Italy in 1535. 

The order is a female branch of the Barnabite Fathers. Their purpose was to be co-workers with the Barnabite Fathers (founded by the same founder) in bringing about a renewal of faith in a society that had become very worldly.

History
The Angelic Sisters were founded in the sixteenth century (1535) in Milan (Italy), by Anthony Maria Zaccaria. The Angelicals worked to educate girls and assist poor women. In 1537 Cardinal Niccolò Ridolfi invited them to Vicenza, where they received the support of the Valmarana family. Other convents soon followed in Verona, Padua, and Venice.

In 1552, by a Papal decree, the Angelic Sisters were asked to become a cloistered community, thus discontinuing their active apostolate. It was not until 1926 that another Papal decree, dated July 5 (feast of Saint Anthony Maria Zaccaria) authorized the Congregation of the Angelic Sisters of Saint Paul to restore its original purpose of active life.

Present day
The Angelic Sisters offer retreats at Villa Santa Rita in Segni, Italy. They also serve in Brazil, Belgium, Democratic Republic of Congo, Spain, Portugal, Kosovo, United States, Albania, Philippines, Chile and recently in Poland, Indonesia, and Rwanda.

See also
 Ludovica Torelli

References

Catholic female orders and societies
1535 establishments in the Holy Roman Empire
1535 in Christianity
Religious organizations established in 1535
Catholic religious orders established in the 16th century
Organisations based in Milan
Women's organisations based in Italy